Self-medication is a human behavior in which an individual uses unprescribed drugs to treat untreated and/or undiagnosed ailments. 

Self-medication may also refer to:

 Self Medication (album), a 2008 album by the Slackers
 "Self-Medication" (The Venture Bros.), an episode of The Venture Bros
 Zoopharmacognosy, self-medication in animals

See also 
 Self Medicated, a 2005 film by Monty Lapica